Tommaso Stigliani (1573 – 27 January 1651) was an Italian poet, literary critic, and writer.

Biography
He was born in Matera, and educated in Naples where he met with the poets Torquato Tasso and Giambattista Marino. With the latter, Stigliani started a lifelong polemic and argument. Especially in Dello occhiale (Venice: Carempello, Sandro Bazacchi, 1627), Stigliani laments Marino's many “failures” in the poem Adone. Marino refused, Stigliani indignantly points out, to follow Aristotle's unities, ignoring the need for a proper beginning, middle, and an end. The poem is overwhelmed by superfluities, enthusiasms, and disproportion. In chapter 6, Stigliani regrets the way Marino “stumbles” through the episodes of Adonis and Venus. And so on, for more than 500 pages (there are tables at the end that list all of Marino's “errors”).

Stigliani's contentious personality led him initially to seek employment in various courts of Northern Italy, including Parma, where he was employed by the Duke. But ultimately had to remove himself to Rome where he published a volume of his works, mainly romantic sonnets, in Canzoniero dato in luce da Balducci (1625, Rome). He had already published Il Mondo Nuovo (1617, Piacenza), an epic poem about the discovery of America. In his depiction, Stigliani merges a detailed description of America with characters and situations that are closer to the realities of life in Europe in the 1600s, creating a bridge between the two continents. Stigliani’s America is an allegory of the old world and the poet used it to construct a critique of the society of the day. The description of the newt that lives in the Rio de la Plata is a way to make fun of his competitor Giambattista Marino; the execution of the amazons in the poem is a criticism of the behavior of his patron Ranuccio Farnese; the mad people of the island of Brandana mirror the behavior of all the princes and courtiers who occupy every European Renaissance court. And since it is a poem, the shrewd poet can always defend himself by saying that the Mondo nuovo is, in part, a fictional work. According to Stigliani, the new world with all its faults such as cannibalism and the freedom of sexual mores is, despite everything, better than the corruption and flaws which he finds in his contemporary Europe.

Thanks to his friendship with Galileo supporter Virginio Cesarini, Stigliani was given the task of editing Galileo's Saggiatore (The Assayer) (1623). Tommaso Stigliani died in Rome and his letters were published posthumously in 1661.

Works

Bibliography

References

External links
 

1573 births
1651 deaths
17th-century Italian writers
Italian poets
People from Matera
Baroque writers